Emil Collett (22 December 1875 – 9 June 1940) was a Norwegian chemist and entrepreneur.

He graduated from the Norwegian Military Academy as an officer in 1895 and studied chemistry in Berlin, obtaining a doctorate in 1903. With Sam Eyde, he founded Elektrokjemisk A/S i 1904. He then served as director of Notodden Salpeterverk A/S, head of Norsk Hydro's research department and director at Norsk Aluminium Company A/S. In 1933, he founded Collett & Co. with his brother Ove Collett, and their main product was Sana-Sol.

A member of the Collett family, he was the son of landowner Albert Collett, and was married to Gudrun Collett.

In 1930, he received the French Legion of Honour.

References 

Norwegian people of English descent
Norwegian chemists
Emil
1875 births
1940 deaths
Norwegian Military Academy alumni
Norwegian expatriates in Germany
Recipients of the Legion of Honour